The European Film Award for Best Screenwriter is an award given out at the annual European Film Awards to recognize a screenwriter who has delivered an outstanding screenplay in a film industry. The award is presented by the European Film Academy (EFA) and was first presented in 1988 to French director and screenwriter Louis Malle for Goodbye Children.

István Szabó, Agnès Jaoui, Jean-Pierre Bacri, Thomas Vinterberg, Tobias Lindholm, Ruben Östlund  and Paweł Pawlikowski are the only writers who have received this award more than once, with two wins each.

Winners and nominees

1980s

1990s

2000s

2010s

2020s

Most wins by screenwriter

References

External links
European Film Academy archive

Screenwriter
 
Screenwriting awards for film
Awards established in 1988
1988 establishments in Europe